Everybody is the debut album from New York City based band Gods Child. The band members (Chris Seefried on vocals, guitars, and Mellotron; Gary DeRosa on keyboards; Craig Ruda on bass; and Alex Alexander on drums, percussion, and loops), are all from New York City.

The band members cite Patti Smith and the Velvet Underground as their main inspirations. However, several tracks on this album (such as "Wolf", which features spiky, over-amped guitars against a stressed-out string section, and "Stone Horses", which kicks off with a funky Mellotron before sliding into a smooth, danceable beat) show the unmistakable influence of U2. Everybody is reminiscent of Zooropa school. This is not surprising, considering that Everybody was mixed by Robbie Adams, who also worked on Zooropa.

Gods Child's highest honor came when "Everybody's 1", appeared on two Billboard charts simultaneously in 1994. The song peaked at #18 on the Mainstream Rock chart and #25 on the Modern Rock Tracks chart.

The album was released on CD and vinyl. It was produced by band members Chris Seefried and Gary DeRosa under the pseudonym Bullfrog and the Elephant. The cover photograph is that of an amusement ride at Coney Island.

Promotional videos for "Everybody's 1" and "Stone Horses" were released on iTunes in March 2006.

Track listing

Personnel
 Chris Seefried – vocals, electric guitar, acoustic guitar, Mellotron, bass, percussion, samples
 Gary DeRosa – wurlitzer piano, strings, casio, synthesizer, percussion, background vocals, loops
 Alex Alexander – drums, percussion
 Craig Ruda – bass

Additional personnel
 Sean Pelton – drums on "Everybody's 1"
 Frank Funaro – drums on "Reachin'"
 Everette Bradley – background vocals on "Reachin'"
 Mark Plati – bass on "Wolf", "Milk"
 Greg Calbi – mastering
 Grant Austin – engineer
 Will Schillinger – engineer
 Robbie Adams – mixing
 Larry Bussacca – photography
 Hugo Burnham – A&R
 Elizabeth Tirone – art direction

Single

References

1994 debut albums
Gods Child albums
Warner Records albums
Albums produced by Chris Seefried